Anastrangalia rubriola is a species of beetle from family Cerambycidae that feed on morinda spruce.

Subspecies
Anastrangalia rubriola kashmirica (Plavilstshikov)

References

External links
Anastrangalia rubriola www.gorodinski.ru

Lepturinae
Beetles described in 1878